The Louis Smith Tainter House is a historic building in Menomonie, Wisconsin, United States. The building was built in 1889 by architect Harvey Ellis; it was funded by Andrew Tainter, a partner in Knapp, Stout & Co., as a home and wedding gift for his son Louis Smith Tainter. The building was built out of locally quarried sandstone in the Richardsonian Romanesque style.  Paul Wilson, the son of lumberman William Wilson, owned the house after Tainter; in 1940, Dunn County repossessed the property for back taxes. The Stout Institute bought the property from the county and converted it to a women's dormitory named Eichelberger Hall for the University of Wisconsin–Stout in 1945. The house was later converted to offices for the university and now houses the Stout University Foundation and the Stout Alumni Association. On July 18, 1974, the house was added to the National Register of Historic Places.

References

External links
Property record at the Wisconsin Historical Society

Houses in Dunn County, Wisconsin
Houses completed in 1889
Houses on the National Register of Historic Places in Wisconsin
Romanesque Revival architecture in Wisconsin
University of Wisconsin–Stout
National Register of Historic Places in Dunn County, Wisconsin